The 2007 Kerry Senior Football Championship was the 107th staging of the Kerry Senior Football Championship since its establishment by the Kerry County Board in 1889. The draw for the opening round fixtures took place on 28 March 2007. The championship ran from 12 May to 11 November 2007.

South Kerry entered the championship as the defending champions in search of a fourth successive title.

The final was played on 11 November 2007 at Austin Stack Park in Tralee, between Feale Eangers and South Kerry in what was their second meeting in the final and a first in 25 years. Feale Rangers won the match by 1-04 to 0-06 to claim their third championship title overall and a first title in 27 years.

Kilcummin's D. J. Fleming was the championship's top scorer with 0-41.

Team changes

To Championship

Promoted from the Kerry Intermediate Football Championship
 Ardfert

From Championship

Relegated to the Kerry Intermediate Football Championship
 John Mitchels

Results

Round 1

 South Kerry received a bye to Round 3.

Round 2

Relegation playoff

Round 3

Quarter-finals

Semi-finals

Final

Championship statistics

Top scorers

Overall

In a single game

Miscellaneous
 Feale Rangers win a first title in 27 years.
 South Kerry are the first team to qualify for four finals in a row since John Mitchels between 1959-62.
 Kilcummin play in the Munster Senior Club Football Championship.
 Ardfert make their first appearance at senior level.

References

Kerry Senior Football Championship
2007 in Gaelic football